This is a list of members of the Australian House of Representatives of the 42nd Parliament of Australia (2007–2010), as elected at the 2007 federal election.

There were a total of 150 members. Since the 2007 federal election, and subsequent by-elections and defections, the Labor Party had 83 members and formed the government. The opposition Coalition had a total of 63 members; 54 of whom were  members and nine of which were  members (down one Liberal and one National since the election). In addition, there were four Independents (up from two at the election).

Members

Leadership

Presiding officer

Majority leadership (Labor)

Minority leadership (Liberal-National) 

 The National MP for Gippsland, Peter McGauran resigned on 4 April 2008; National candidate Darren Chester won the resulting by-election on 28 June.
 The Liberal MP for Mayo, Alexander Downer, resigned on 14 July 2008. Liberal candidate Jamie Briggs was elected at the resulting by-election on 6 September.
 The National MP for Lyne, Mark Vaile, resigned on 19 July 2008. Independent candidate and outgoing NSW state MP for Port Macquarie, Rob Oakeshott, won the resulting by-election on 6 September.
 The Liberal MP for Bradfield, Brendan Nelson, resigned on 19 October 2009. Liberal candidate Paul Fletcher was elected the resulting by-election on 5 December 2009.
 The Liberal MP for Higgins, Peter Costello, resigned on 19 October 2009. Liberal candidate Kelly O'Dwyer was elected at the resulting by-election on 5 December 2009.
 The MP for Ryan, Michael Johnson, was expelled from the Liberal Party on 20 May 2010.

See also
 Results of the 2007 Australian federal election (House of Representatives)

References

Members of Australian parliaments by term
21st-century Australian politicians